The War Machine is a science fiction novel by Roger MacBride Allen and David Drake.

Plot introduction
Captain Allison Spencer is forcibly divorced from his wife, then is promoted to command a fleet of ships heading to the Daltgeld system. There, he encounters an unknown enemy that threatens the whole galaxy. The story is set sometime 5341 years after the founding of the interstellar Pact, or 9095 A.D.
 
The title refers to the alien construct which was designed as a weapon capable of taking over any device and running it according to a central controller.

Plot summary

After being forcibly divorced from his wife for political reasons, Spencer tries to force his way on board the ship she’s on. After being ejected, he gets drunk and implanted with a "feelgood" device that stimulates the pleasure centers of the brain. Spencer is saved from this addictive and lethal fate by an unknown Kona Tatsu (secret police) agent. They clean and care for him, then send him on a mission to the Daltgeld system.

Working with Agent Suss Nanahbuc, Spencer is given command of a task force and told that Kona Tatsu (KT) agents are disappearing from the planet. Upon arrival, the ``Duncan`` splashes down to dock for repairs, and Nanahbuc heads out to learn the fate of the other agents.

While docked, Spencer gets a visit from McCain, a KT agent hiding from the enemy. However, the enemy is aboard and kills McCain before they can analyze the data she found. The enemy turns out to be a small mercury-like blob that seems to react to its environment, weighs 16 tons, and can control the devices it infects. Spencer leaves the ship and closes it down tight, but it’s already too late.

In the end, it turns out an alien artifact was recently discovered in an asteroid, and the captain of the mining freighter was "convinced" to take the artifact to the head of a local conglomerate, Jameson. The device, a helmet made of a mercury-like substance, takes over Jameson and uses him as a control center for taking over the system, with plans to leave it and spread throughout the galaxy. After losing his flagship to prevent an alien from leaving the system, Spencer and Nanahbuc locate the main asteroid of the enemy and head in with the task force to put an end to it for good.

Characters in "The War Machine"
Captain Allison Spencer – Task force commander
Suss Nanahbuc – KT agent
Tallen Deyi – Captain of the ``Banquo``
Tarwa Chu – Spencer’s executive officer
Sisley Mannerling – KT informer on Daltgeld
Dostchem Horchane – Capuchin communications worker and labor organizer

Release details
1989, U.S., Baen, Pub date November 1989, Paperback

External links 
 
 The War Machine on Fantastic Fiction.com

1989 American novels
1989 science fiction novels
American science fiction novels
Novels by David Drake
Novels by Roger MacBride Allen
Baen Books books
Military science fiction novels
Novels set in the future
Fiction set in the 7th millennium or beyond